To date, there have been three astronauts of Arab origin, also called "najmonauts" (najm meaning star in Arabic). Prince Sultan bin Salman Al Saud of Saudi Arabia flew in the US Space Shuttle in 1985.
Syrian astronaut Muhammed Faris made a space flight in 1987, as part of a joint Syrian-Soviet mission. In 2019 Hazza Al Mansouri of the United Arab Emirates flew in the Soyuz MS-15 spacecraft to the International Space Station.

Sultan bin Salman Al Saud

In 1985, the Arab Organization of Space Communications nominated Sultan bin Salman Al Saud. Originally a civilian pilot holding a commercial pilots licence,  Al Saud was born in Riyadh and holds a bachelor's degree of Arts in Media from the University of Denver, Colorado.

Muhammed Faris

Muhammed Faris is a Syrian astronaut born in Aleppo in 05/26/1951. Faris is the first Syrian astronaut and second Arab into space, flying in the Soviet spacecraft Soyuz m3 (TM-2) to space station Mir on 22 July 1987 with two Soviet cosmonauts in the program for cooperation in space between Syria and the Soviet Union.He is credited with carrying the first recorded Earth dirt into space, which was a vial carrying soil from Damascus.

Hazza Al Mansouri

On 25 September 2019, Hazza Al Mansouri became the first Emirati to become an astronaut, travelling in the Soyuz MS-15 spacecraft to the International Space Station.
During his short stay aboard the ISS, Al Mansouri conducted 15 experiments created by UAE school students and selected under an MBRSC "Science in space" competition, conducted Earth observation experiments, filmed the first ever tour of the ISS in Arabic and became the first Middle eastern person to be studied following time in microgravity.

Jessica Meir

On 25 September 2019, Jessica Meir whose father is of Sephardic Jewish descent and was born in Baghdad, travelled in the Soyuz MS-15 spacecraft to the International Space Station.
She delivered an empowering video message of support to kids on the Hope Buses in Baghdad.

See also
 List of Muslim astronauts

References 

Arab
astronauts